Tepu may refer to:

 Tepu, Rajasthan, India
 Țepu, Romania
 Pelelu Tepu, a village in Suriname
 Tepú or Metrosideros stipularis, a species of the myrtle family